Thomas Strickland may refer to:

Thomas Strickland (died c. 1392), represented Westmoreland in the Merciless Parliament
Thomas de Strickland (1367–1455), English soldier known for carrying the banner of St. George at the battle of Agincourt
Thomas Strickland (died 1612), represented Westmoreland in Parliament in 1601 and 1604
Sir Thomas Strickland (cavalier) (1621–1694), English politician and soldier
Sir Thomas Strickland, 2nd Baronet (c. 1639–1684), English politician
Thomas John Francis Strickland (c. 1682–1740), English Roman Catholic bishop of Namur and doctor of the Sorbonne
Tom Strickland (born 1952), American lawyer and politician

See also 
Strickland  (surname)